This is a list of Idaho's 27 state parks managed by the Idaho Department of Parks and Recreation. In Idaho state code, there are 30 state parks listed, including Mowry State Park, Veteran's State Park, and Glade Creek. While these three remain state property, they are managed by entities other than the state of Idaho:

 Veterans Park in Boise is managed by the City of Boise Parks Department 
 Mowry State Park on Lake Coeur d'Alene is managed by Kootenai Parks and Waterways 
 Glade Creek near Lolo Pass is managed by the U.S. Forest Service

State parks and trails

See also

List of U.S. national parks
 National Parks in Idaho

References

External links
Idaho Department of Parks and Recreation

 
State parks
Idaho state parks